Otto Gaiser (5 October 1919 – 22 January 1944) was a Luftwaffe ace with 66 confirmed kills, and he was the recipient of the Knight's Cross of the Iron Cross during World War II. The Knight's Cross of the Iron Cross was awarded to recognise extreme battlefield bravery or successful military leadership.

Career

In 1942, Gaiser was assigned to Jagdgeschwader 51 (JG 51—51st Fighter Wing) where he served as Rudolf Wagner's wingman. Wagner went on to become a Luftwaffe ace as well. Gaiser claimed his first kill on 16 March 1943. That day, he shot down a Soviet Lavochkin-Gorbunov-Gudkov LaGG-3 fighter near Vyazma. Gaiser served with 10. Staffel of JG 51 which at the time was under the command of Oberleutnant Horst-Günther von Fassong. He achieved his 10th victory on 11 July, when he claimed another LaGG-3 shot down. Gaiser claimed 17 victories in August, including five Soviet Ilyushin Il-2 ground-attack aircraft shot down on 14 August, making him an "ace-in-a-day".

On 22 January 1944, Gaiser was last seen in combat with Ilyushin Il-2 ground-attack aircraft near Berdychiv, Ukraine. 
He has remained missing to this day. It is thought he became a victim of the Soviet ground defences. On 9 June 1944 he was posthumously awarded the Knight's Cross of the Iron Cross and promoted to Leutnant. Before he disappeared, Gaiser was credited with 66 victories in 380 missions. All his air victories were achieved over the Eastern Front (World War II) and included 21 Il-2 Sturmoviks.

Summary of career

Aerial victory claims
According to US historian David T. Zabecki, Gaiser was credited with 66 aerial victories. Mathews and Foreman, authors of Luftwaffe Aces – Biographies and Victory Claims, researched the German Federal Archives and found records for 66 aerial victory claims, all of which claimed on the Eastern Front.

Victory claims were logged to a map-reference (PQ = Planquadrat), for example "PQ 35 Ost 36624". These sectors were then subdivided into 36 smaller units to give a location area 3 × 4 km in size.

Awards
 Front Flying Clasp of the Luftwaffe
 Iron Cross (1939) 2nd and 1st Class
 German Cross in Gold on 28 January 1944 as Feldwebel in the 10./Jagdgeschwader 51
 Honour Goblet of the Luftwaffe on 3 April 1944 as Feldwebel and pilot
 Knight's Cross of the Iron Cross on 9 June 1944 as Oberfeldwebel and pilot in 10./Jagdgeschwader 51

See also
 List of Knight's Cross of the Iron Cross recipients (G)
 List of World War II aces from Germany
 List of World War II flying aces

Notes

References

Citations

Bibliography

External links
TracesOfWar.com
Aces of the Luftwaffe 

1919 births
1940s missing person cases
1944 deaths
Luftwaffe pilots
German World War II flying aces
Recipients of the Gold German Cross
Recipients of the Knight's Cross of the Iron Cross
Luftwaffe personnel killed in World War II
Aviators killed by being shot down
People from Reutlingen
People from the Free People's State of Württemberg
Missing in action of World War II
Missing person cases in Ukraine
Military personnel from Baden-Württemberg